Cisneros is a town and municipality in the Antioquia Department, Colombia. Part of the subregion of Northeastern Antioquia.

Climate
Cisneros has a tropical rainforest climate (Af) with heavy rainfall year-round.

References

External links
 Cisneros official website

Municipalities of Antioquia Department